The 2nd Arizona State Legislature, consisting of the Arizona State Senate and the Arizona House of Representatives, was constituted from January 1, 1915, to December 31, 1916, during the second term of George W. P. Hunt as Governor of Arizona, in Phoenix. The number of senators and representatives remained constant, at 19 and 35 respectively. The Democrats increased their lead in both houses, winning 18 of the 19 senate seats, and winning a clean sweep of the house, 35–0.

Sessions
The Legislature met for the regular session at the State Capitol in Phoenix on January 11, 1915; and adjourned on March 11.

A special session was called by the governor, and met between April 23 – May 29, 1915. A second special session was invoked from June 1–28, 1915.

State Senate

Members
The asterisk (*) denotes members of the previous Legislature who continued in office as members of this Legislature.

House of Representatives

Members
The asterisk (*) denotes members of the previous Legislature who continued in office as members of this Legislature.

References

Arizona legislative sessions
Arizona
Arizona
1915 in Arizona
1916 in Arizona